Decynes are alkynes with one triple bond and the molecular formula C10H18.

The isomers are:
 1-Decyne
 
 3-Decyne
 4-Decyne
 5-Decyne

Alkynes